Niels Bertelsen (9 March 1926 – 1 June 1989) was a Danish boxer. He competed in the men's lightweight event at the 1952 Summer Olympics. At the 1952 Summer Olympics, he lost to Clayton Kenny of Canada.

References

1926 births
1989 deaths
Danish male boxers
Olympic boxers of Denmark
Boxers at the 1952 Summer Olympics
Sportspeople from Copenhagen
Lightweight boxers